Takase (written: 高瀬 lit. "tall shallows" or "shallow river") is a Japanese surname. Notable people with the surname include:

, Japanese jazz pianist and composer
, Japanese voice actor
, Japanese tennis player
, Japanese mixed martial artist
, Japanese cinematographer and visual effects editor
, Japanese sprinter
, Japanese women's footballer
, Japanese actor and comedian

Japanese-language surnames